Arncliffe may refer to:

Arncliffe, New South Wales, Australia
Electoral district of Arncliffe
Arncliffe railway station
Arncliffe, North Yorkshire, England